You're Lookin' at Country is the eighteenth solo studio album by American country music singer-songwriter Loretta Lynn. It was released on September 20, 1971, by Decca Records.

Critical reception

In the issue dated October 9, 1971, Billboard published a review of the album, which read, “With the spotlight on her recent smash hit, the title tune of this package, the top stylist comes up with a powerhouse production here. She turns in exceptional treatments of Kristofferson’s "I’d Rather Be Sorry", John Denver's "Take Me Home, Country Roads", and her own original, "Close My Eyes". Top sales item."

Cashbox published a review in the October 2 issue which said, "A guaranteed winner, LP starts out with
Loretta's top ten track and continues to look at country straight in the eye and ear. Her version of John Denver's "Take Me Home, Country Roads" should be immediately well-received by programmers and could easily be forced out as her next single. Two Lynn originals are also standouts: "Close My Eyes" and "From Now On." LP also contains a fine reading of Kristofferson's "I'd Rather Be Sorry", the big Ray Price hit and "Indian Lake." Totally compelling, Loretta has once again proved her ever-constant strength."

Commercial performance 
The album peaked at No. 7 on the US Billboard Hot Country LP’s chart.

The album's only single, "You're Lookin' at Country", was released in July 1971 and peaked at No. 5 on the US Billboard Hot Country Singles chart. In Canada, the single peaked at No. 1 on the RPM Country Singles chart.

Recording 
Recording sessions for the album took place on July 19 and August 3, 1971, at Bradley's Barn in Mount Juliet, Tennessee. Six songs on the album were from previous recording sessions. "You Can't Hold on to Love" was recorded on May 14, 1969, during a session for 1969's Woman of the World/To Make a Man. "I Burnt the Little Roadside Tavern Down" and "Love Whatcha Got at Home" were recorded during sessions for 1970's Here's Loretta Singing "Wings Upon Your Horns", on October 2 and 3, 1969, respectively. Two songs were recorded during the December 8, 1969 session for 1970's Loretta Lynn Writes 'Em and Sings 'Em, "Close My Eyes" and "From Now On". The album's title track, "You're Lookin' at Country", was recorded on November 25, 1970, during a session for 1971's I Wanna Be Free.

Track listing

Personnel
Adapted from the album liner notes and Decca recording session records.
Harold Bradley – bass guitar, electric bass guitar
Owen Bradley – producer
Ray Edenton – guitar, acoustic guitar
Johnny Gimble – fiddle
Buddy Harman – drums
Junior Huskey – bass
Darrell Johnson - mastering
The Jordanaires – background vocals
Loretta Lynn – lead vocals
Grady Martin – guitar, lead electric guitar
Charlie McCoy – harmonica
Bob Moore – bass
Hargus Robbins – piano
Hal Rugg – steel guitar
Dale Sellars – guitar
Jerry Shook – guitar
Bobby Thompson - banjo
Dave Thornhill – guitar
Pete Wade – guitar, electric guitar
Teddy Wilburn - liner notes

Charts 
Album

Singles

References 

1971 albums
Loretta Lynn albums
Albums produced by Owen Bradley
Decca Records albums